Bristol Rovers are an association football club based in the city of Bristol in South West England, who currently play in . For the majority of the club's history the first team have played in the English Football League, but they have also spent time in the Western Football League and Southern Football League, as well as having very brief spells in the West Midlands (Regional) League and National League.

In  years of playing league football Bristol Rovers have faced many opponents, some of whom are still familiar names, while others were consigned to history many years ago. The table below lists every opponent faced by the club's first team in league competition, along with details of which league they played in at the time, their record against that team, and the dates of the first and most recent meetings with them.

Club history

Bristol Rovers were founded in 1883 under the name Black Arabs Football Club, so-called because they shared a home field with the Arabs Rugby Club and they wore predominantly black jerseys. A year later, in 1884, the football club decided to forge their own identity and renamed themselves Eastville Rovers, after the Eastville area of Bristol where they had their headquarters. Throughout their early years they played only friendly matches (referred to at the time as test matches), and from the 1897–98 season they also participated in the Gloucestershire Senior Cup.

Eastville Rovers finally joined a formal league for the first time in 1892, when they were founder members of what was called at the time the Bristol & District League, but later became the Western Football League. The league rules initially stated that all players must be amateur, but growing pressure from the teams for the league to turn to professionalism led to the establishment of the Western League Professional Section in 1897. Only eight teams entered the professional division for the 1897–98 season though, so Rovers also entered the Birmingham & District League (now the West Midlands (Regional) League) and renamed themselves Bristol Eastville Rovers as they would now be facing teams from further afield. They continued to play in both leagues for two years until joining the Southern Football League (and renaming themselves again, this time to Bristol Rovers) in 1899, where they remained until joining the Football League in 1920. They stayed in the Football League for 94 years until relegation from League Two at the end of the 2013–14 season saw them play a single season in the Football Conference before being promoted back into the EFL at the first attempt, where they have remained ever since.

All-time league record

  Teams with this background and symbol in the "Club" column are current divisional rivals of Bristol Rovers.
  Clubs with this background and symbol in the "Club" column are defunct.

Statistics are correct as of match played 18 March 2023.

Notes

References

Bibliography

Bristol Rovers F.C.
Bristol Rovers